Charlie Thomas Cox (born 15 December 1982) is an English actor. He is known for portraying Matt Murdock / Daredevil in several projects of the Marvel Cinematic Universe franchise, including lead roles in the television series Daredevil (2015–2018) and the upcoming Daredevil: Born Again.

Cox portrayed Owen Sleater in the second and third seasons of HBO's Boardwalk Empire (2011–2012) and Jonathan Hellyer Jones in the 2014 film The Theory of Everything. More recently, he starred in the RTÉ drama series Kin (2021) and the Netflix spy miniseries Treason (2022). Cox's breakout role was as Tristan Thorn in the 2007 fantasy film Stardust, one of a series of roles he had in predominately British productions during the first decade of his career. He made his West End debut the following year in a revival of the Harold Pinter plays The Lover and The Collection. Following his successes on-screen in the 2010s, he acted in a 2019 stage production of Harold Pinter's Betrayal, first in the West End and then on Broadway.

Early life
Cox was born in London, England, and raised in East Sussex. He is the son of Patricia (née Harley) and Andrew Frederick Seaforth Cox, a publisher. He is the youngest of five children and has one brother and three half-siblings from his father's first marriage.

Cox was raised Catholic and was educated at two private boarding schools: Ashdown House School in the village of Forest Row in East Sussex and Sherborne School in the market town of Sherborne in Dorset. Growing up, Cox did not consider a career in acting and only seriously considered it during his last few years of school. After graduating from Sherborne in 2001, he moved to London and began training at the Bristol Old Vic Theatre School the following year.

Career

Early career (2002–2006) 
Cox was cast in his first significant professional role at age eighteen in the psychological thriller Dot the i, released in 2003. Following filming, he enrolled at the Bristol Old Vic Theatre School. In the summer following his first year of study, He was cast as Lorenzo in the 2004 Al Pacino-vehicle The Merchant of Venice, breaking the school's policy of not allowing students to audition for outside productions. Subsequently, he decided not to return to school and continued working, appearing in guest spots on TV and supporting roles in movies like the 2005 historical drama Casanova and the 2006 BBC sci-fi film A for Andromeda.

Prominence in television and film (2007–2014) 
Cox's breakout role was as the main protagonist, Tristan Thorn, in the 2007 fantasy film Stardust, in which he starred opposite Claire Danes. The film was successful with both critics and audiences globally and introduced Cox to a wider audience. He made his West End debut the following year in Harold Pinter's The Lover/The Collection at the Ambassadors Theatre in London. It began previews on 15 January 2008 and opened on 29 January.

He was next seen in the 2008 film Stone of Destiny as Ian Hamilton and in the 2009 historical drama Glorious 39, which were widely released in the United Kingdom. In 2010 he had the title role in Kleist's The Prince of Homburg at the Donmar Warehouse in London. In September of that year, he played the closeted gay Duke of Crowborough in the first episode of the ITV drama series Downton Abbey. In 2011 he played St. Josemaría Escrivá in the Roland Joffé film There Be Dragons and Ishmael in Encore's Moby Dick miniseries.

Also in 2011, he signed on for a recurring role in the second season of the Martin Scorsese-produced HBO original series Boardwalk Empire as Owen Sleater, an Irish enforcer with ties to the IRA. His character became a regular for the series' third season, broadcast in September 2012. He received a Screen Actors Guild Award as part of the ensemble in 2011 and another nomination the following year.

In 2013 he starred in the independent film Hello Carter and the BBC Cold War thriller Legacy. He had lead roles in two unproduced CBS TV pilots: a political drama titled The Ordained in February 2013 and an untitled Wall Street show executive-produced by John Cusack in February 2014. At the end of 2013, production began on the film The Theory of Everything, where Cox portrays Jonathan Hellyer Jones, the second husband of Jane Hawking. The film premiered at the Toronto International Film Festival in September 2014 and was nominated for Best Picture at the 2015 Academy Awards.

Daredevil (2014–2018) 

Cox portrayed Matt Murdock in  Marvel's Daredevil TV series as well as the 2017 team-up miniseries event The Defenders, produced and released through Netflix. His performance was praised and given a Helen Keller Achievement Award for his role by the American Foundation for the Blind.

It was announced that Cox had won the role in May 2014, and later reported that Marvel had considered him for it since 2012. Production on the first season began in Summer 2014, and it premiered on Netflix in April 2015. It ran for three seasons and was produced over four years, concluding in late 2018. In the following years, Cox shared his interest in reprising the role in a future project, also noting his contractual obligations by Marvel Studios to do so.

Between filming seasons of Daredevil, Cox made his New York theater debut, co-starring in the off-Broadway production of Incognito at the Manhattan Theatre Club. In late 2017 it was announced that he had joined the cast of Stripped, a thriller produced by Lorenzo di Bonaventura, who also produced Cox's breakout film Stardust, but it was never produced. He also acted opposite Michael Caine, Jim Broadbent, Ray Winstone, and others in the 2018 film King of Thieves, based on the true story of the 2015 Hatton Garden jewelry heist in London; it reunited him with James Marsh, who directed him in 2014's The Theory of Everything.

New projects and return to Daredevil (2019–present) 
After Daredevil abruptly ended, Cox took the opportunity to star opposite Tom Hiddleston and Zawe Ashton in the West End production of Harold Pinter's Betrayal, which opened on 14 March 2019 and closed on 8 June. Cox was sought for the role by director Jaime Lloyd, who had previously directed him in the 2008 production of the Pinter play The Lover and The Collection. Betrayal transferred to Broadway with the original cast for a 17-week limited engagement, beginning previews on 14 August and closing on 8 December 2019.

During this period, Cox also took part in some of his friends' projects; in late 2018 he acted in the short film The Knot, directed by Daredevil and The Defenders script supervisor Rebecca Schwab, and in a 2019 episode of Daredevil costar Deborah Ann Woll's Dungeons & Dragons internet show Relics and Rarities.

In Fall 2020, Cox began filming the RTÉ Dublin crime series Kin, in which he stars with Aiden Gillen, Clare Dunne, Maria Doyle Kennedy, Ciarán Hinds, and Emmett Scanlan. The eight-part series was released on 9 September 2021, on AMC+ in the US and Canada, and on 12 September 2021, on RTE in Ireland.

In December 2021, Marvel Studios president Kevin Feige confirmed that Cox would be reprising the role of Daredevil in the studio's Marvel Cinematic Universe (MCU) productions; his first project "remain[ed] to be seen" at that time. The first Marvel Studios production he appeared in was Spider-Man: No Way Home (2021), in which Matt Murdock gives legal advice to Peter Parker for ostensibly murdering Mysterio. In July 2022, he was confirmed to be reprising the role in the Disney+ television series She-Hulk: Attorney at Law (2022) and Echo, and that he would additionally lend his voice to the character in the upcoming animated series Spider-Man: Freshman Year (2024), and star in the revival Daredevil: Born Again (2024).

Cox stars in the British spy drama miniseries Treason, which premiered on Netflix on 26 December 2022.

Personal life
In September 2018, Cox married Samantha Thomas, Executive Vice President of Bron TV, with whom he has a daughter and a son. At the time of their marriage, they both worked for Marvel Television, where Thomas was Vice President of Original Programming and Cox starred in Daredevil. The family lives in Connecticut. Cox has previously lived in New York City, Los Angeles, and in the Chelsea and Highbury neighbourhoods of London. He is a football fan and supports Arsenal F.C.

Filmography

Film

Television

Stage

Awards and nominations

References

External links

 
Charlie Cox at the Internet Broadway Database 
Charlie Cox at the Internet Off-Broadway Database
Charlie Cox at the UK Theatre Database

1982 births
21st-century English male actors
Alumni of Bristol Old Vic Theatre School
English male film actors
English male stage actors
English male television actors
English Roman Catholics
Living people
Male actors from London
People educated at Ashdown House
People educated at Sherborne School